Guitar Hero III: Legends of Rock is the third release in the Guitar Hero series of music video games.  This game is the first in the series to be developed by Neversoft, and was distributed by RedOctane and Activision.  The game was released on the PlayStation 2, PlayStation 3, Wii, and Xbox 360 game consoles, and also for Microsoft Windows and Apple Macintosh personal computers.

Guitar Hero III features 73 songs on the game's media; this includes the 39 single-player songs, three "Boss Battle" songs, six co-op career exclusive songs, and 25 bonus songs. The Xbox 360 and PlayStation 3 versions support downloadable content in the form of new songs for the game.  As of September 12, 2008, there are 59 songs available as downloadable content for both platforms, bringing the total number of available songs for these versions to 132.  Four downloadable songs were only available for a limited time.  The Xbox 360 and PlayStation 3 versions each had an exclusive song.

Game disc songs

Main setlist
Guitar Hero III features 73 songs spread across both the Solo and Co-Op Career modes. These songs are arranged in eight sequential tiers based on their relative difficulty.  The player(s) must complete some or all of the songs in one tier (based on the career difficulty selected), including the Encore, to access the next one.  During the Solo Career mode, the player will also encounter three Boss Battles, a new mode introduced in Guitar Hero III, at the ends of three tiers as listed below, prior to performing the Encore song.  The player must attempt the Boss Battle three times, but after the third time the player has the option of passing the Boss Battle in order to continue progression in the game. However, this option is only available for the first two boss battles (Slash and Tom Morello).  In Co-Op Career mode, the players only perform the first six tiers, do not encounter any Boss Battles, and have different Encore songs from the Solo Career mode.

Once a tier is open at any difficulty level, all songs except the Encores and Boss Battle songs become available for all other game modes; the Encore songs become available once they are completed.  The three Boss Battle songs are not playable outside of Solo Career mode.  However, these songs were available as free downloadable content for the Xbox 360 and PlayStation 3 versions of the game.  All songs (except Boss Battles) can be unlocked for all modes through special cheat codes for the game, as to, for example, allow a solo player to access the Co-Op Encore songs without having to play through Co-Op mode.

Being based on the same engine as the seventh generation versions of Guitar Hero III, Guitar Hero Arcade features a set of 50 songs chosen from the main, bonus and downloadable content lists.

Bonus songs
All but one of the bonus songs are purchased in the in-game store using the virtual money earned through the Career modes of the game.  The exception, "Through the Fire and Flames" by DragonForce, is unlocked after the player completes the solo Career mode on any difficulty, and can be played during the credits, though is not required (but the player cannot exit during the sequence). The song cannot be failed while being played during the credits.

Downloadable songs

Both the Xbox 360 and the PlayStation 3 version of Guitar Hero III feature the ability to download additional songs from the consoles' respective online stores; all are master recordings.  Most songs must be purchased in "track packs" of three and cannot be purchased individually while only some songs are available as "singles." There are several free songs available. The downloadable songs have been released on the same day on both the Xbox Live Marketplace and the PlayStation Store, with five exceptions. Besides the two console-exclusive songs, the three songs from the Companion Pack were not released for the PlayStation 3 until August 7, 2008. The two console-exclusive songs come from console-exclusive games; the "Halo Theme" is from the Halo series and is only available for the Xbox 360 version and "The End Begins" is from the God of War series and is only available for the PlayStation 3 version.

Soundtrack CD

A special soundtrack CD titled Guitar Hero: Legends of Rock Companion Pack was released as part of the promotion for the game's release. The CD has songs that are included on the game disc, as well as two of the three songs from the "Companion Pack", and one from the Velvet Revolver pack.

A special code is packaged with the CD that allows Xbox 360 users to download the "Companion Pack" on Xbox Live Marketplace for free. The song pack was exclusive to the Xbox 360 and was only obtainable by using the code that came with the CD. On August 7, 2008, the song pack was made available to all on the Xbox Live Marketplace and PlayStation Store.

Track listing

References

External links
 

3: Legends of Rock